San Rafael is a district of the San Ramón canton, in the Alajuela province of Costa Rica.

Geography 
San Rafael has an area of  km² and an elevation of  metres.

Demographics 

For the 2011 census, San Rafael had a population of  inhabitants.

Transportation

Road transportation 
The district is covered by the following road routes:
 National Route 1
 National Route 135
 National Route 156
 National Route 703
 National Route 713
 National Route 714

References 

Districts of Alajuela Province
Populated places in Alajuela Province